Extrapolation is an academic journal covering speculative fiction, established in 1959. It was the first journal in its field and is published by Liverpool University Press.

History
Extrapolation was established in 1959 by Thomas D. Clareson and was published at the College of Wooster. It was the first academic journal in the field of speculative fiction.  In 1979, it moved to the Kent State University Press. A decade later, Clareson stepped down as editor-in-chief and was succeeded by Donald M. Hassler of the KSU English Department. In 2002 the journal was transferred to the University of Texas at Brownsville. At that time Donald M. Hassler became executive editor, and the position of editor was filled by Javier A. Martinez of UTB/TSC's Department of English. In 2007, Hassler retired and the current editors are Martinez, Andrew M. Butler (Canterbury Christ Church University), Gerry Canavan (Marquette University), Rachel Haywood-Ferreira (Iowa State University) and John Rieder (University of Hawaii). The reviews editor is D. Harlan Wilson (Wright State University).

The journal is currently published by Liverpool University Press.

Contents
Extrapolation covers all areas of speculative culture, including print, film, television, comic books, and video games, and particularly encourages papers which consider popular texts within their larger cultural context. The journal publishes papers from a wide variety of critical approaches including literary criticism, Utopian studies, genre criticism, feminist theory, critical race studies, queer theory, and postcolonial theory. It is interested in promoting dialogue among scholars working within a number of traditions and in encouraging the serious study of popular culture.

Extrapolation appears three times a year.

See also 
Femspec
Foundation – The International Review of Science Fiction
Science Fiction Studies

Notes

References

Further reading 
 Peña, Adrian. Sci-fi and Spanish literature publications call UTB/TSC home in The Collegian Online, Vol. 57, Issue 22, Feb. 28, 2005.

External links 
 

Triannual journals
Science fiction and fantasy journals
English-language journals
Publications established in 1959
University of Liverpool